This is a list of films which have placed number one at the weekend box office in Romania during 2010.

Highest-grossing films

See also
 List of Romanian films
 List of highest-grossing films in Romania

References

Romania
2010
2010 in Romanian cinema